Möng Pu or Mong Pu is a village in  Mong Ping Township, Mongsat District, Shan State, eastern Myanmar.

Geography
Mong Pu lies in a small valley surrounded by mountains. Loi San mountain is located about 2 km to the southeast of the town, overlooking the Möng Pu valley.

History
Mongpu State (Möngpu, where Mong is equivalent to Thai Mueang) was one of the Shan States. It was a tributary state of Kengtung State. The capital of Mongpu State and the residence of its ruler was the town of Mong Pu, which is this town.

References

Mongsat District
Township capitals of Myanmar